Chak No. 168/171 NB is a village in Sargodha District, Punjab, Pakistan. It is also known as by its public name Chak Mangla

History
In the early 1900s, the British government, in order to drive rebels (like Dulla Bhatti) out of the jungles of Punjab, decided to open Sargodha, Lyallpur (now Faisalabad) and Montgomery (now Sahiwal) area for farming and residence. Sir James Broadwood Lyall and his engineers came up with the whole plan of various villages and instead of giving them typical names, the team chose to number them according to their location from water streams derived from the Jehlum River.

The tribe of Mangla was selected to reside in two villages or Check(points) or Chaks: Chak No. 168 and 171. Tribal chiefs requested the local government to allow them to live in the same village, so some changes were made to the maps and they let it be Chak 168/171.

References

Geography of Punjab, Pakistan
Populated places in Sargodha District